Jorge del Prado Chávez (15 August 1910 – 13 August 1999) was a Peruvian politician. He served as general secretary of the Peruvian Communist Party (PCP) from 1966 to 1991.

Life and career
Del Prado Chávez was the son of Eleodoro del Prado and Carmen Chávez. He did his primary schooling at the Colegio San José in Arequipa, followed by secondary education at Colegios de la Independencia Nacional (Arequipa) and Colegio Nuestra Señora de Guadalupe (Lima). He studied journalism at Universidad de San Marcos. He worked as painter, artist and journalist.

In 1928 del Prado Chávez founded the 'Revolution' group in Arequipa, consisting of intellectuals and trade unionists. He joined the PCP in 1929. He was a disciple and associate of José Carlos Mariátegui. Becoming a political whole-timer, he left his artistic career. He was included in the Central Committee in 1931. In 1942 he was elected to the Political Commission and Secretariat of the PCP Central Committee. In 1966 he became the general secretary of the PCP.

In the aftermath of the victory of the Cuban revolution and the Sino-Soviet split del Prado Chávez remained firmly attached to the Soviet line, discarding the possibility for an armed revolution in Peru under the existing conditions.

Del Prado Chávez stood as a candidate in several elections. In 1962 he stood as a National Liberation Front (FLN) candidate. He was elected as a member of the 1978 Constituent Assembly and again elected as senator in the 1980, 1985 and 1990 elections. In 1980 he contested on behalf of the Left Unity (UI). In 1985 he stood as a United Left candidate, obtaining 183,022 votes. In 1990 he again contested on behalf of IU.

Del Prado Chávez wrote several books about the communist and labour movements of Peru. He was the author of three books on Mariátegui.

Del Prado Chávez received various international orders and medals, such as the Order of Georgi Dimitrov (Bulgaria), Marx Medal (German Democratic Republic), Order of Friendship of Peoples (Soviet Union) and the Order of the 40th Anniversary of the Defeat of Fascism (Czechoslovakia).

References

1910 births
1999 deaths
Peruvian Communist Party politicians
United Left (Peru) politicians
People from Arequipa
Recipients of the Order of Georgi Dimitrov
Recipients of the Order of Friendship of Peoples